MX is an album by David Murray released on the Red Baron label in 1993. It features performances by Murray, Ravi Coltrane, Bobby Bradford, John Hicks, Fred Hopkins and Victor Lewis. The album is dedicated to the memory of Malcolm X.

Reception

The AllMusic review awarded the album 4.5 stars.

Track listing
 "MX" (Osser, Theile) - 5:19 
 "Icarus" - 8:29 
 "El Hajj Malik El-Shabazz" - 8:24 
 "A Dream Deferred" (Osser, Thiele) - 6:52 
 "Blues For X" (Osser, Thiele) - 13:08 
 "Hicks Time" (Hicks) - 10:22 
 "Harlemite" - 8:17 
All compositions by David Murray except as indicated
Recorded September 25, 1992, NYC

Personnel
David Murray - tenor saxophone
Ravi Coltrane - tenor saxophone
Bobby Bradford - cornet
John Hicks - piano
Fred Hopkins - bass
Victor Lewis - drums

References 

1993 albums
David Murray (saxophonist) albums
Red Baron Records albums